ASIX Electronics Corp. is a fabless semiconductor supplier with a focus on networking, communication, and connectivity applications. ASIX Electronics specializes in Ethernet-centric silicon products such as non-PCI Ethernet controller, USB 2.0 to LAN controller, and network SoC for embedded networking applications.

Corporate history 
ASIX was founded in May 1995 in Hsinchu Science Park, Taiwan. In 2002, ASIX announced its first USB to MII chip. In June 2007, electronicstalk.com featured the AX11005BF, billed as the industry smallest single-chip embedded Ethernet MCU. Electronicstalk.com describes powering embedded systems in a machine to machine world (M2M) in reference to the AX110xx family of chips.

 ASIX Electronics introduced the industry's first:
 USB 3.0 to Gigabit Ethernet controller
 Non-PCI/USB 2.0 Gigabit Ethernet controller
 Single chip microcontroller with TCP/IP, 10/100 Mbit Fast Ethernet MAC/PHY, and flash
 Industry smallest single chip embedded Ethernet MCU

 Asix Electronics saw its revenues jump 59.3% sequentially to NT$31.5 million (US$957,000) in December 2006 on shipments of USB-to-Ethernet controller ICs for Nintendo's Wii consoles, according to market sources.
 ASIX is listed as a vendor in the 2007 EDN Microprocessor Directory.
 ASIX Electronics Corp:To acquire 100 pct stake in ZYWYN CORPORATION with amount of $8 million.

Products 
The current offerings are as follows:
 Non-PCI/PCMCIA embedded Ethernet
 High-speed USB-to-LAN
 Embedded network SoC
 I/O connectivity
 Embedded Wireless Modules

Wii LAN Adapter 

ASIX manufactures the chipset in the Wii LAN Adapter. The Wii is equipped with Wi-Fi but does not include an Ethernet port; gamers can purchase a Wii LAN Adapter sold by Nintendo and other manufacturers to give Ethernet capability to the Wii.

See also
 List of companies of Taiwan
 List of system-on-a-chip suppliers
 Network interface controller (NIC)
 Semiconductor industry in Taiwan

References

Taiwanese companies established in 1995
Semiconductor companies of Taiwan
Fabless semiconductor companies
Companies listed on the Taiwan Stock Exchange
Electronics companies established in 1995
Networking hardware companies
Networking companies